Funk All Y'all is the debut album by American electro band Detroit Grand Pubahs, released in August 2001 by record label Intuit-Solar and featuring the successful single "Sandwiches".

Release 

"Sandwiches" was released as a single on June 1, 2000, prior to the album's release. The song became a Top 40 hit in the United Kingdom, peaking at number 29 on the UK Singles Chart. The song became a moderate dance hit, peaking at number 29 on the US Billboard Hot Dance Club Songs.

Funk All Y'all was released on August 7, 2001, by record label Intuit-Solar.

Reception 

John Bush of AllMusic wrote: "Andy Toth and Paris the Black Fu proved themselves masters of the production game long ago, and though the music is often relegated to second-division status amidst all the role-playing, Funk All Y'all is great fun for all those bored by the scads of 'intelligent' techno out there." Kori Golding of Chart wrote: "Funk and techno come together in a lubricated orgy that will make you want to get nekkid and slap some fat ass thighs and floss with a thong". Village Voice's Hobey Echlin was less favourable, writing: "in the words of Spinal Tap, there's a fine line between clever and stupid, and before long, the Pubahs' imagination starts to outpace their minimal techno palette. [...] By the time the Pubahs' pun-happy song titles get better than the actual songs [...] and the vocals gum up otherwise slamming electro throwdowns [...] the Pubahs commit the greatest sin of all: forgetting this is, if not dance music, then at least party music, not a comedy album with a Groovebox."

Track listing

References 

2001 albums